This is the complete list of Asian Winter Games medalists in short-track speed skating from 1986 to 2017.

Men

500 m

1000 m

1500 m

3000 m

5000 m relay

Women

500 m

1000 m

1500 m

3000 m

3000 m relay

References

External links
 1986 Results
 1990 Results
 1996 Results

Short track speed skating
Medalists

Speed skating-related lists